

The Islamic New Year, also called the Hijri New Year, is the day that marks the beginning of a new lunar Hijri year, and is the day on which the year count is incremented. The first day of the Islamic year is observed by most Muslims on the first day of the month of Muharram. The epoch (reference date) of the Islamic era was set as the year of the emigration of Muhammad and his followers from Mecca to Medina, known as the Hijrah, which equates to 622 CE in the Gregorian calendar. All religious duties, such as prayer, fasting in the month of Ramadan, and pilgrimage, and the dates of significant events, such as celebration of holy nights and festivals, are calculated according to the Islamic calendar.

While some Islamic organizations prefer determining the new month (and hence the new year) by local sightings of the moon, most Islamic institutions and countries, including Saudi Arabia, follow astronomical calculations to determine future dates of the Islamic calendar. There are various schemas for calculating the tabular Islamic calendar (i.e. not based on observation), which results in differences of typically one or even two days between countries using such schema and those that use actual lunar sightings. For example, the Umm al-Qura calendar used in Saudi Arabia was reformed several times in recent years. The current scheme was introduced in 1423 AH (15 March 2002).

A day in the Islamic calendar is defined as beginning at sunset. For example, 1 Muharram 1432 was defined to correspond to 7 or 8 December 2010 in civil calendars (depending on the country). For an observation-based calendar, a sighting of the new moon at sunset of 6 December would mean that 1 Muharram lasted from the moment of sunset of 6 December to the moment of sunset of 7 December, while in places where the new moon was not sighted on 6 December 1 Muharram would last from the moment of sunset of 7 December to the moment of sunset of 8 December.

Gregorian correspondence

Since the Islamic lunar year is eleven to twelve days shorter than the solar year as counted by the  Gregorian calendar, the Islamic New Year does not occur on the same day of the Gregorian calendar every year.

The following dates are predicted for the Gregorian calendar dates to correspond with the Islamic new year:

See also 
 Solar Hijri calendar#New Year's Day

References

External links

Calendar converters

Public holidays in Algeria
Public holidays in Egypt
Public holidays in Indonesia
New Year
Islamic terminology
New Year celebrations